William Dunn Moseley (February 1, 1795January 4, 1863) was an American politician.  A Democrat and North Carolina native, Moseley became the first Governor of the state of Florida, serving from 1845 until 1849 and leading the establishment of the state government.

Early life and education
William Dunn Moseley was born on February 1, 1795, at Moseley Hall in Lenoir County, North Carolina, which is a different place than Moseley Hall on the Northeast branch of the Cape Fear created by colonial official Edward Moseley, to whom he was not related. He was the son of Matthew and Elizabeth Herring Dunn Moseley, who built this Moseley Hall. He and his father were distant descendants of William Moseley, the immigrant ancestor, who came to Virginia in 1649 and built Greenwich near Norfolk on the Elizabeth River in what was then Lower Norfolk County. The plantation house was later known as Rolleston Hall.

Moseley graduated from the University of North Carolina at Chapel Hill in 1818.  He was of entirely English ancestry, all of which had been in America since the days of the original thirteen colonies. He received his master's degree from UNC in 1821. While at the university, Moseley was the roommate of future president James K. Polk.

Marriage and family
In 1822, Moseley married Susan Hill; the couple had six children: William Green Moseley, Elizabeth H. Moseley, Susan Hill Moseley, Alice Hill Moseley, Alexander Moseley, and Matthew Moseley. Susan Hill Moseley died in March 1842, after the Moseleys moved to Florida.

Career

In 1817, Moseley became a tutor at the university. After studying law, he was admitted to the bar and began practice in Wilmington. Like many lawyers of the time, law was not his only profession; Moseley also farmed and was a schoolteacher.

From 1829 to 1837, Moseley represented Lenoir County in the North Carolina Senate, serving as speaker for four terms between 1832 and 1835. He lost the Democratic nomination for governor in North Carolina by three votes.

In 1835, Moseley and his family moved to Lake Miccosukee in Jefferson County, Florida, after purchasing a plantation there. In 1840, Moseley was elected to the territorial House of Representatives. In 1844, he won a seat in the territorial Senate. On March 3, 1845, Florida was admitted as  the twenty-seventh state of the Union.

Later in 1845, in the first statewide election, Moseley won the election for governor of Florida. He beat Richard Keith Call, who had been the governor of Florida Territory, making Moseley the first governor of the state of Florida. Moseley was sworn in on June 25, 1845. During his term, he established the new state government. The state Capitol building was completed during his first year in office. Moseley oversaw the state's role in the Mexican–American War. Southern states supported the war with troops as they saw it as an opportunity to gain territory where slavery could be used.

Moseley worked to resolve conflicts between white settlers and Seminole Indians. He also encouraged agriculture, supporting new citrus, avocado, tobacco, and cotton industries.  During his administration, the federal government built Fort Jefferson, on one of the coral keys off the southern Florida coast, and Fort Clinch on Amelia Island, near modern-day Fernandina Beach, Florida.

Moseley was a strong supporter of states' rights. He favored the establishment of state-funded public schools.

Constitutionally limited to a single term, Moseley returned to his plantation after ending his term on October 1, 1849. Two years later, he settled in the town of Palatka in Putnam County, where he operated a citrus grove. Moseley died on January 4, 1863, and was buried at the West View Cemetery in Palatka.

After his death, his daughters commissioned a portrait to be painted from a daguerreotype. They presented the portrait to be hung in a state portrait gallery at the Florida

References

External links

Official Governor's portrait and biography from the State of Florida

1795 births
1863 deaths
Democratic Party governors of Florida
North Carolina state senators
People from Palatka, Florida
19th-century American politicians